Sanjay Rastogi is a polymer physicist and professor of polymer technology in the department of materials at Loughborough University, United Kingdom.

External links
 Sanjay Rastogi's profile at Loughborough University

Living people
Polymer scientists and engineers
Alumni of the University of Bristol
Academics of Loughborough University
Year of birth missing (living people)
Place of birth missing (living people)